Matthias N’Gartéri Mayadi (1942 – 19 November 2013) was a Chadian Roman Catholic bishop. He was the Roman Catholic archbishop of the Archdiocese of N'Djaména in Chad from 2003 until his death in 2013. 

N'Gartéri Mayadi was ordained as a priest on 30 December 1978 and became the bishop of Sarh in 1987, which he was until 1990. He was the bishop of Moundou from 1990 to 2003. On 31 July 2003, N'Gartéri Mayadi succeeded Charles Louis Joseph Vandame as the archbishop of N'Djaména.

References

External links
Metropolitan Archdiocese of N’Djaména, Chad

1942 births
2013 deaths
Chadian Roman Catholic archbishops
20th-century Roman Catholic bishops in Chad
21st-century Roman Catholic archbishops in Africa
Roman Catholic bishops of Sarh
Roman Catholic bishops of Moundou
Roman Catholic archbishops of N'Djaména